Miloslav Kučeřík (born 22 June 1959) is a Czech gymnast. He competed in eight events at the 1980 Summer Olympics.

References

External links
 

1959 births
Living people
Czech male artistic gymnasts
Olympic gymnasts of Czechoslovakia
Gymnasts at the 1980 Summer Olympics
People from Vsetín
Sportspeople from the Zlín Region